Appalachian studies is the area studies field concerned with the Appalachian region of the United States.

Scholarship
Some of the first well-known Appalachian scholarship was done by Cratis D. Williams. His 1937 MA thesis in English from the University of Kentucky focused on 471 ballads and songs from eastern Kentucky and his 1961 PhD dissertation at New York University was called "The Southern Mountaineer in Fact and Fiction" with part of it appearing in The Appalachian Journal 1975-76 (Williams 1–2)

Berea College president W.D. Weatherford received a Ford Foundation grant in 1957 to underwrite an exhaustive regional study, The Southern Appalachian Region: A Survey, published in 1962, which many see as the beginning of the modern Appalachian studies movement (Blaustein 47–8).

In 1966, West Virginia University librarian Robert F. Munn noted that "more nonsense has been written about the Southern Mountains than any comparable area in the United States." He also observed that there was "distressingly little in the way of useful primary and secondary materials" available for historical research on Appalachia" (Munn 1966).

Over the four decades since Munn's comments, a wealth of excellent Appalachian scholarship has been published. Appalachian Studies is interdisciplinary, as befits the study of a complex and diverse region and people. Appalachian Studies includes such disciplines as history, literature, anthropology, music, religion, economics, education, environment, folklore and folk customs, labor issues, women's issues, ethnicity, health care, community organizing, economic development, coal mining, tourism, art, demography, migration, and urban & rural planning. Appalachian scholarship has addressed – and continues to address – various issues within all of these academic disciplines.

Several academic journals are dedicated to Appalachian Studies, including Appalachian Journal, published by Appalachian State University, Journal of Appalachian Studies, published by the Appalachian Studies Association, Now & Then, published by East Tennessee State University, and Appalachian Heritage, published by Berea College. For a larger list of pertinent Appalachian Studies journals and magazines, refer to Marie Tedesco's Selected Bibliography on the Appalachian Studies Association website.

Much of the scholarship and research about Appalachia is done by scholars who are members of the Appalachian Studies Association.

Academics
A number of colleges and universities in and around Appalachia offer courses and degrees in Appalachian Studies. These range from a Master of Arts in Appalachian Studies offered at Appalachian State University and East Tennessee State University, to undergraduate minors at a dozen schools. Many schools also have Appalachian Studies collections and archives in their libraries.

Brief bibliography
The following is a brief list of important books in the Appalachian Studies canon that would serve as a good introductory reading list. These titles were culled from a poll of members of the Steering Committee of the Appalachian Studies Association taken in the Spring of 2007.
 Appalachia: A History. By John Alexander Williams. Chapel Hill: University of North Carolina Press. 2002.
 Appalachia on Our Mind: the Southern Mountains and Mountaineers in the American Consciousness, 1870-1920. By Henry D. Shapiro. Chapel Hill: University of North Carolina Press. 1978.
 Appalachia in the Making: the Mountain South in the Nineteenth Century. Ed. by Mary Beth Pudup, Dwight B. Billings, and Altina L. Waller. Chapel Hill: University of North Carolina Press. 1995.
 Appalachia: Social Context Past and Present. Fifth Edition. Ed. by Phillip J. Obermiller and Michael E. Maloney. Kendall Hunt Publishers. 2007.
 Appalachians and Race: the Mountain South from Slavery to Segregation. Ed. by John C. Inscoe. Lexington: University Press of Kentucky. 2000.
 Back talk from Appalachia : Confronting Stereotypes. Ed. by Dwight B. Billings, Gurney Norman, and Katherine Ledford. Lexington: University Press of Kentucky. 2001
 Fighting Back in Appalachia: Traditions of Resistance and Change. Ed. by Stephen L. Fisher. Philadelphia: Temple University Press. 1993.
 Encyclopedia of Appalachia. Ed. by Rudy Abramson & Jean Haskell. Knoxville: University of Tennessee Press. 2006
 A Handbook to Appalachia: an Introduction to the Region. Ed. by Grace Toney Edwards, JoAnn Aust Asbury, and Ricky Cox. Knoxville: University of Tennessee Press. 2006
 High Mountains Rising: Appalachia in Time and Place. Ed. by Richard A. Straw and H. Tyler Blethen. Urbana: University of Illinois Press. 2004.
 The United States of Appalachia: How Southern Mountaineers Brought Independence, Culture and Enlightenment to America. Jeff Biggers. Emeryville, CA: Shoemaker and Hoard. 2006.

For more detailed bibliographies, refer to the Bibliography section of the ASA website. For teachers who would like to incorporate Appalachian Studies content into their classroom, the ASA website includes a list of Appalachian Studies syllabi for college and university teachers, as well as a list of resources for K-12 teachers.

References
 Appalachian Studies Association, "Appalachian Libraries and Archives," Appalachian Studies Association Website. 2007. Accessed May 4, 2007
 Appalachian Studies Association, "Appalachian Studies Syllabi," Appalachian Studies Association Website. 2007. Accessed May 9, 2007
 Appalachian Studies Association, "Marie Tedesco's Selected Bibliography," Appalachian Studies Association Website. 2007. Accessed April 22, 2007
 Appalachian Studies Association, "Programs in Appalachian Studies," Appalachian Studies Association Website. 2007. Accessed May 22, 2007
 Blaustein, Richard. The Thistle and the Brier: Historical Links and Cultural Parallels Between Scotland and Appalachia,  (2003): 47–8.
 Munn, Robert. F. 1966. Research Materials on the Appalachian Region. Mountain Life & Work. (Summer): 13–15.
 Williams, Cratis D.Ed. David Cratis Williams, Patricia D. Beaver. Tales from Sacred Wind: Coming of Age in Appalachia. (2003): 1–2.

Further reading
 Berry, Chad, Phillip J. Obermiller, and Shaunna L. Scott, eds. Studying Appalachian Studies: Making the Path by Walking (University of Illinois Press, 2015). xii, 224 pp.
 Newby, Tim "Bluegrass in Baltimore" (McFarland, 2015). 244 pp.

External links

 Appalachian Studies at the University of North Carolina
 Digital Library of Appalachia
 "Space, Place, and Appalachia"
 University of Kentucky Appalachian Center 

 
American studies
Appalachia
Appalachian culture
Society of Appalachia